Anarsia dryinopa is a moth of the  family Gelechiidae. It is known from Australia and the warmer regions of New Zealand in both the North and the South Islands.

Taxonomy

This species was first described in 1897 by Oswald Bertram Lower using a specimen collected at Broken Hill in New South Wales in June. In 2010 Robert Hoare synonymised Izatha griseata with this species.

Description
The forewings are rather dark fuscous, irregularly irrorated (speckled) with white and with several small undefined dark spots on the costa. There are numerous scattered undefined dots and dashes of black scales irrorated with whitish. The hindwings are fuscous, thinly scaled and semitransparent towards base, darker posteriorly.

Distribution 
This species is native to Australia. It has been introduced to New Zealand and has been observed in the Northland, Auckland and Nelson regions.

Host species 
The larvae have been recorded feeding on the phyllodes and in galls on Acacia species in Australia, and in New Zealand they have been reared from the foliage of Acacia longifolia, Acacia melanoxylon and Albizzia julibrissin.

References

dryinopa
Moths described in 1897
Moths of New Zealand
Moths of Australia
Taxa named by Oswald Bertram Lower